Rainbow Bay is a bay, beach and  locality at the southern end of Coolangatta within the City of Gold Coast, Queensland, Australia.

History

The bay was originally but unofficially known as Shark/Sharks Bay. In 1925, the Point Danger Progress Association requested the Coolangatta Town Council to change the name to Rainbow Bay, which the council approved at its meeting on 31 May 1925. In August 1925, the council erected directional signs to Rainbow Bay. Rainbow Bay is one of the most popular beaches on the Gold Coast. The beach attracts surfers going to nearby Snapper Rocks and Greenmount Beach because of the spectacular waves, as the beach is included as part of the Superbank. The beach is also popular with families who flock to the sheltered beach because of the safety and lack of rips.

Amenities

Rainbow Bay is home to Rainbow Bay Surf Lifesaving Club near Snapper Rocks.

See also
Snapper Rocks

References

External links
 
 

Coolangatta
Surfing locations in Queensland
Beaches of Queensland